Wagamama Ki no Mama Ai no Joke/Ai no Gundan (わがまま 気のまま 愛のジョーク／愛の軍団; Selfishness, Mind's Condition, Love's Joke/ Army of Love), official English title being Selfish, Easy Going, Jokes of Love / "GUNDAN" Of The Love, is Morning Musume's 54th single. It was released on August 28, 2013 in 7 editions: 2 regular and 5 limited editions.

Track list

Regular edition A
Wagamama Ki no Mama Ai no Joke
Ai no Gundan
Bouya (坊や; Boy) - Sayumi Michishige, Mizuki Fukumura, Haruna Iikubo, Masaki Sato, Haruka Kudo
Wagamama Ki no Mama Ai no Joke (instrumental)
Ai no Gundan (instrumental)

Regular edition B
Wagamama Ki no Mama Ai no Joke
Ai no Gundan
Funwari Koibito Ichinensei (ふんわり恋人一年生;  Gentle First Year Lover) - Erina Ikuta, Riho Sayashi, Kanon Suzuki, Ayumi Ishida, Sakura Oda
Wagamama Ki no Mama Ai no Joke (instrumental)
Ai no Gundan (instrumental)

Limited edition A
Wagamama Ki no Mama Ai no Joke
Ai no Gundan
Makeru Ki Shinai Kon'ya no Shoubu (負ける気しない 今夜の勝負, I Don't Feel Like Losing, Tonight's A Battle)
Wagamama Ki no Mama Ai no Joke (instrumental)
Ai no Gundan (instrumental)
DVD
Wagamama Ki no Mama Ai no Joke (MV)
Wagamama Ki no Mama Ai no Joke (Dance Shot ver.)

Limited edition B
Wagamama Ki no Mama Ai no Joke
Ai no Gundan
Makeru Ki Shinai Kon'ya no Shoubu
Wagamama Ki no Mama Ai no Joke (instrumental)
Ai no Gundan (instrumental)
DVD
Ai no Gundan (MV)
Ai no Gundan (Dance Shot ver.)

Limited edition C
Wagamama Ki no Mama Ai no Joke
Ai no Gundan
Makeru Ki Shinai Kon'ya no Shoubu
Wagamama Ki no Mama Ai no Joke (instrumental)
Ai no Gundan (instrumental)
DVD
Wagamama Ki no Mama Ai no Joke (close-up ver.)
Ai no Gundan (close-up ver.)
Making of.

Limited edition D
Wagamama Ki no Mama Ai no Joke
Ai no Gundan
Bouya – Sayumi Michishige, Mizuki Fukumura, Haruna Iikubo, Masaki Sato, Haruka Kudo
Wagamama Ki no Mama Ai no Joke (instrumental)
Ai no Gundan (instrumental)

Limited edition E
Wagamama Ki no Mama Ai no Joke
Ai no Gundan
Funwari Koibito Ichinensei - Erina Ikuta, Riho Sayashi, Kanon Suzuki, Ayumi Ishida, Sakura Oda
Wagamama Ki no Mama Ai no Joke (instrumental)
Ai no Gundan (instrumental)

Members at time of single 
6th generation: Sayumi Michishige
9th generation: Mizuki Fukumura, Erina Ikuta, Riho Sayashi, Kanon Suzuki
10th generation: Haruna Iikubo, Ayumi Ishida, Masaki Sato, Haruka Kudo
11th generation: Sakura Oda

Concert performances
Wagamama Ki no Mama Ai no Joke
Hello! Project 2013 SUMMER COOL HELLO! ~Sorezore!~
Ai no Gundan
Hello! Project 2013 SUMMER COOL HELLO! ~Mazekoze!~

Television performance
Wagamama Ki no Mama Ai no Joke
[2013.08.23] Music Station
[2013.08.30] Music Dragon

Song information
Wagamama Ki no Mama Ai no Joke
Lyrics & composition: Tsunku
Arrangement: Kaoru Okubo
Vocals:
Main vocals: Riho Sayashi, Sakura Oda
Center vocals: Mizuki Fukumura, Sayumi Michishige, Ayumi Ishida, Masaki Sato
Minor vocals: Erina Ikuta, Kanon Suzuki, Haruna Iikubo, Haruka Kudo
Ai no Gundan
Lyrics & composition: Tsunku
Arrangement: Kaoru Okubo
Vocals:
Main vocals: Riho Sayashi, Sayumi Michishige, Mizuki Fukumura, Sakura Oda
Center vocals: Ayumi Ishida, Masaki Sato
Minor vocals: Erina Ikuta, Kanon Suzuki, Haruna Iikubo, Haruka Kudo
Bouya
Lyrics & composition: Tsunku
Arrangement: Kaoru Okubo
Vocals: Sayumi Michishige, Mizuki Fukumura, Haruna Iikubo, Masaki Sato, Haruka Kudo
Funwari Koibito Ichinensei
Lyrics & composition: Tsunku
Arrangement: AKIRA
Rap arrangement: U.M.E.D.Y.
Vocals: Riho Sayashi, Kanon Suzuki, Sakura Oda
Rappers: Erina Ikuta, Ayumi Ishida
Makeru Ki Shinai Kon'ya no Shoubu
Lyrics & composition: Tsunku
Arrangement: Kotaro Egami
Vocals:
Main vocals: TBA
Sub vocals. TBA

References

External links
Official Website
Discography: Hello! Project
Tsunku's blog comment (translation)
Lyrics: Ai no Gundan

2013 songs
2013 singles
Morning Musume songs
Oricon Weekly number-one singles